King's School Worcester Boat Club is a rowing club on the River Severn, based at the Michael Baker Boathouse, Severn Street, Worcester, Worcestershire.

History
The club was founded in 1877 and belongs to the King's School, Worcester.

A new boathouse was built in 2012 following a donation of £2.5 million by former pupil Michael Baker.

The club has produced multiple British champions.

Honours

British champions

References

Sport in Worcestershire
Sport in Worcester, England
Rowing clubs in England
Rowing clubs of the River Severn
Scholastic rowing in the United Kingdom